Horsetail Falls is a seasonal waterfall near Queenstown, Tasmania. The falls cascades over 50 metres down a steep cliff face, and can be seen from the road. A boardwalk giving closer access was opened in 2017.

References

Waterfalls of Tasmania